Amandeep Narayan Khare (born 5 August 1997) is an Indian cricketer who plays for Chhattisgarh cricket team.

In December 2015, he scored a century for India national under-19 cricket team against Sri Lanka national under-19 cricket team and help his team to win a four-run D/L win over Sri Lanka Under-19s at the Premadasa Stadium.He is the first player from Chhattisgarh cricket Team Who selected for Under-19 Cricket World Cup He made his first-class debut for Chhattisgarh in the 2016–17 Ranji Trophy on 6 October 2016. He scored a century in his second match against Andhra Pradesh to help Chhattisgarh recover in their first innings. He made his Twenty20 debut for Chhattisgarh in the 2016–17 Inter State Twenty-20 Tournament on 29 January 2017. He made his List A debut for Chhattisgarh in the 2016–17 Vijay Hazare Trophy on 25 February 2017.

In October 2019, he was named in India A's squad for the 2019–20 Deodhar Trophy.

References

External links
 

1997 births
Living people
Indian cricketers
Chhattisgarh cricketers
People from Durg
Cricketers from Chhattisgarh
21st-century Indian people